Diversity is the fifth LP released by the reggae artist Gentleman.

Track listing
 "The Reason" - 2:51
 "Ina Time Like Now" - 3:09
 "Lonely Days" - 3:16
 "Regardless" - 3:20
 "It No Pretty" - 3:07
 "I Got To Go" - 3:50
 "The Finish Line" - 3:33
 "Changes" - 3:22
 "To The Top" (Feat. Christopher Martin) - 3:08
 "No Time To Play" - 3:18
 "Fast Forward" - 3:33
 "Hold On Strong" - 3:46
 "Moment Of Truth" - 3:16
 "Tempolution" (Feat. Red Roze) - 4:11
 "Another Melody" (Feat. Tanya Stephens) - 4:00
 "Help" (Feat. Million Stylez) - 3:53
 "Along The Way" (Feat. Patrice) - 3:32
 "Good Old Days" (Feat. Sugar Minott) - 3:30
 "Everlasting Love" - 3:12

Charts

Weekly charts

Year-end charts

References

2010 albums
Gentleman (musician) albums